Rabben Ridge is a small, isolated ridge about 5 nautical miles (9 km) north of Stabben Mountain in the north part of the Gjelsvik Mountains, Queen Maud Land. Mapped by Norwegian cartographers from surveys and air photos by Norwegian-British-Swedish Antarctic Expedition (NBSAE) (1949–52) and air photos by the Norwegian expedition (1958–59) and named Rabben (the small elongated elevation).

References

External links

Ridges of Queen Maud Land
Princess Martha Coast